Syntomeida joda is a moth in the subfamily Arctiinae. It was described by Herbert Druce in 1897. It is found in Mexico.

References

Moths described in 1897
Euchromiina